Frank H. Peterson Academies of Technology is a public, magnet high school located in Jacksonville, Florida. The school is based around Arts and Technology-based programs, such as Communications, Automotive Technology, Cosmetology, Culinary Arts, Aviation Technology, Childcare, Agriculture Science and Robotics.

Students at Peterson earn an Industry Certificate of Completion as well as a High School Diploma. Peterson Academies also offers Advanced Placement courses. Frank H. Peterson is a Duval County Career and College Preparatory High School.

References

External links 
 Frank H. Peterson Website

History of Jacksonville, Florida
High schools in Jacksonville, Florida
Duval County Public Schools
Public high schools in Florida
Magnet schools in Florida
1969 establishments in Florida
Educational institutions established in 1969